Chappanda (Çappanda) is a rural locality (a selo), the administrative centre of and one of two settlements, in addition to Saltany, in Chappandinsky Rural Okrug of Nyurbinsky District in the Sakha Republic, Russia. Its population as of the 2002 Census was 998.

References

Notes

Sources
Official website of the Sakha Republic. Registry of the Administrative-Territorial Divisions of the Sakha Republic. Nyurbinsky District. 

Rural localities in Nyurbinsky District